Night Raven is a fictional superhero appearing primarily in Marvel UK Comics, a division of Marvel Comics.

Night Raven first appeared in Hulk Comic #1 (March 7, 1979).

Publication history
Originally created by editors Dez Skinn and Richard Burton, the early Night Raven stories were written by Steve Parkhouse, with art by David Lloyd.  Dez Skinn's immediate superior, Stan Lee, did not like David Lloyd's "blocky" artwork, and thus John Bolton became Lloyd's replacement artist towards the end of the strip's initial run. The original Night Raven strip was greatly influenced by the pulp characters of the 1930s (the time period in which the strip was set), especially The Shadow and The Spider.

Night Raven was one of the few original characters created for Marvel UK in the 1980s, and quickly became a fan favorite, with his appearance in Hulk Weekly #2 being voted "Favourite Single Story" in the British section of the 1980 Eagle Awards. The character was also nominated for British section Eagle Awards in 1980 for "Favourite Character" and "Character Most Worthy of Own Book." Night Raven was again nominated for favourite British character in the 1981 Eagle Awards.

During the decade, Night Raven appeared in various Marvel UK titles, including a run of text stories beginning in Savage Action by Alan McKenzie and continued in Marvel Super Heroes (#382-386) by Alan McKenzie and The Daredevils (#6-11) by Alan Moore and Jamie Delano, later switching to Savage Sword of Conan and finally  Captain Britain volume two. The plot device of having him appear to be immortal and indestructible but in constant pain and gradually losing his sanity as a result, due to the schemes of his equally immortal arch-foe, the Oriental female crime lord Yi Yang, caused his time setting to be gradually moved from the 1930s up to contemporary times.

In the 1990s the character had only a handful of appearances, most prominent of which was a graphic novel, Night Raven: House of Cards. The character's first American appearance was in a supporting role in the graphic novel Fury/Black Widow: Death Duty. In Death Duty, it is revealed that he is unable to die. Night Raven's immortality was contradicted later in the 1995 Marvel US miniseries Nocturne, in which it was revealed that the original Night Raven had died after being poisoned in the 1950s. One of his last acts was to create a battlesuit which was later donned by Graham "Gray" Poldark to become a new hero known as Nocturne. It has since been confirmed that the Nocturne story did not take place in the main Marvel comics reality.

Night Raven is glimpsed in the first issue of The Twelve, where he is one of many costumed heroes pictured in Berlin in a scene dated April 25, 1945. He plays no part in the subsequent story and it is unclear whether or not the creators realized that this would appear to contradict the character's existing continuity.

Powers and abilities
Upon first appearance, Night Raven had no powers, but was a highly trained fighter and marksman who wielded two guns. He was exposed to a chemical toxin by Yi Yang, which made him nearly indestructible, but deformed him and left him with chronic pain. He has a reputation for immortality, but the accuracy of this belief is unclear.

Bibliography
Night Raven (by David Lloyd):
 "Night Raven" (with Steve Parkhouse, in Hulk Comic #1-20, Marvel UK, 1979, collected in Night Raven: The Collected Stories, 64 pages, October 1990)
 "House Of Cards" (with Jamie Delano, one shot, Marvel UK, 1991)
Nocturne (by Dan Abnett, with pencils by Joe Fonteriz and inks by John Stokes (1-2 and 4), 4-issue mini-series, Marvel Comics, 1994)

References

External links
Night Raven at the Appendix to the Handbook of the Marvel Universe
Night Raven at the International Catalogue of Superheroes

Night Raven at Don Markstein's Toonopedia.   from the original on March 28, 2016.

Fictional characters with immortality
Fictional janitors
Fictional soldiers
Marvel Comics mutates
Marvel UK characters
Comics characters introduced in 1979
Comics set in the 1930s
Vigilante characters in comics